The Town of Granada is a Statutory Town in Prowers County, Colorado, United States. The town population was 445 at the 2020 United States Census.

History
A post office called Granada has been in operation since 1873. The community most likely takes its name from nearby Granada Creek.

During World War II, the Granada War Relocation Center (known to internees as Camp Amache) was located west of Granada as a Japanese American internment camp.  It opened in August 1942 and housed a maximum population of 7,318 citizens.

Geography
Granada is located at  (38.064603, -102.311052).

Demographics

As of the census of 2000, there were 640 people, 198 households, and 151 families residing in the town. The racial makeup of the town was 64.69% White, 0.16% Native American, 33.75% from other races, and 1.41% from two or more races. Hispanic or Latino of any race were 62.50% of the population.

There were 198 households, out of which 48.5% had children under the age of 18 living with them, 61.1% were married couples living together, 9.6% had a female householder with no husband present, and 23.7% were non-families. 18.2% of all households were made up of individuals, and 11.6% had someone living alone who was 65 years of age or older.  The average household size was 3.23 and the average family size was 3.77.

In the town, the population was spread out, with 37.7% under the age of 18, 9.1% from 18 to 24, 25.3% from 25 to 44, 18.3% from 45 to 64, and 9.7% who were 65 years of age or older.  The median age was 28 years. For every 100 females, there were 95.1 males.  For every 100 females age 18 and over, there were 100.5 males.

The median income for a household in the town was $26,042, and the median income for a family was $31,750. Males had a median income of $22,167 versus $18,750 for females. The per capita income for the town was $10,561.  About 25.2% of families and 27.8% of the population were below the poverty line, including 34.4% of those under age 18 and 17.5% of those age 65 or over.

Education
Students are served by Granada Undivided High School whose mascot are the Bobcats.

See also

Colorado
Bibliography of Colorado
Index of Colorado-related articles
Outline of Colorado
List of counties in Colorado
List of municipalities in Colorado
List of places in Colorado
National Old Trails Road
Santa Fe National Historic Trail

References

External links

CDOT map of the Town of Granada
Granada @ city-data.com

Towns in Prowers County, Colorado
Towns in Colorado